The tenth elections for Cardiganshire County Council took place in March 1919. They were preceded by the 1913 election and followed by the 1922 election. No election took place in 1916 due to the First World War.

Overview of the result
Despite the upheaval of the war years the Liberals refined their majority.

Candidates

As in previous elections, there were a large number of unopposed returns. In all 31 members were returned without a contest.

Gains and losses

Very few seats changed hands.

Contested elections

It was stated that the bitterest fights were between candidates of the same political persuasion.

Retiring aldermen

Eight aldermen retired, all of whom were Liberals. Their six-year terms had ended in 1916 but they had been re-appointed in 1916 until fresh elections were held. Two of their number, Lima Jones (elected alderman in 1916 following the death of Morgan Evans) at Aberaeron and E. James Davies at New Quay, contested the election and the former was defeated in one of the surprises of the election. D.C. Roberts, R.J.R. Loxadale and the Rev John Williams were re-elected aldermen but Vaughan Davies, the Rev David Evans and D.L. Jones stood down.

New Council

|}

|}

|}

Results

Aberaeron

Aberbanc

Aberporth

Aberystwyth Division 1

Aberystwyth Division 2

Aberystwyth Division 3

Aberystwyth Division 4

Aeron

Borth

Bow Street

Cardigan North

Cardigan South

Cilcennin

Cwmrheidol

Devil's Bridge

Felinfach

Goginan

Lampeter Borough

Llanarth

Llanbadarn Fawr

Llanddewi Brefi

Llandygwydd

Llandysul North

Llandysul South

Llansysiliogogo

Llanfair Clydogau

Llanfarian

Llanfihangel y Creuddyn

Llangoedmor

Llangeitho

Llangrannog

Llanilar

Llanrhystyd

Llanllwchaiarn

Llansantffraed

Llanwnen

Llanwenog

Lledrod

Nantcwnlle

New Quay

Penbryn

Strata Florida

Taliesin

Talybont

Trefeurig

Tregaron

Troedyraur

Ysbyty Ystwyth

Election of Aldermen
Eight aldermen were elected, including only one Conservative, R.S. Rowlands.

D.C. Roberts, Liberal
R.S. Rowland, Conservative
R.J.R. Loxdale, Liberal (retiring alderman, from outside Council - did not seek election)
Griffith Davies, Liberal
Rev John Williams (retiring alderman, from outside Council - did not seek election)
Rev William Griffiths, Liberal
E. Lima Jones, Liberal
Rev T. Mason Jones, Liberal

By-elections

Llanilar by-election
E.J. Evans, Cwncybarcud, who previously represented Llanrhystud from 1901 until 1904 was returned unopposed following the appointment of R.J.R. Loxdale as alderman.

Lledrod by-election
A Liberal candidate was returned unopposed for Lledrod following the appointment of Daniel L. Jones as alderman.

New Quay by-election
Following the appointment of E.J. Davies as alderman no valid nomination was initially received.

Troedyraur by-election

References

1919
1919 Welsh local elections
20th century in Ceredigion